Devosia terrae is a bacterium from the genus of Devosia.

References

Hyphomicrobiales